Jenelle Cunningham (born 29 April 1990) is a Trinidadian footballer who plays as a defender. She has been a member of the Trinidad and Tobago women's national team.

International career
Cunningham played for Trinidad and Tobago at senior level in the 2018 CFU Women's Challenge Series and the 2018 CONCACAF Women's Championship (including its qualification).

International goals
Scores and results list Trinidad and Tobago' goal tally first.

References

External links

1990 births
Living people
Women's association football defenders
Trinidad and Tobago women's footballers
Sportspeople from Port of Spain
Trinidad and Tobago women's international footballers
Competitors at the 2018 Central American and Caribbean Games
Murray State Racers women's soccer players
Trinidad and Tobago expatriate women's footballers
Trinidad and Tobago expatriate sportspeople in the United States
Expatriate women's soccer players in the United States